Economic Anthropology is the journal of the Society for Economic Anthropology, a section of the American Anthropological Association (AAA). The journal was founded in 2014 with an annual themed issue and became biannual in 2016. The current editor-in-chief is Brandon D. Lundy, Professor of Anthropology at Kennesaw State University.

The journal publishes research in economic anthropology and archaeology, as well as related disciplines like economic sociology. In January 2022, the journal will launch a book review section.

Past editors 
Brandon D. Lundy, Kennesaw State University (2018 - Present)
Katherine E. Browne, Colorado State University (? - 2018)

References

Anthropology journals
Biannual journals
English-language journals